The De Winton's shrew (Chodsigoa hypsibius) is a species of mammal in the family Soricidae. It is endemic to China.

References
 Insectivore Specialist Group 1996.  Soriculus hypsibius.   2006 IUCN Red List of Threatened Species.  Downloaded on 30 July 2007.

Mammals of China
Red-toothed shrews
Taxonomy articles created by Polbot
Mammals described in 1899